Twelve Mile Lake Township is one of twelve townships in Emmet County, Iowa, USA.  As of the 2000 census, its population was 202.

History
This township is named from the Twelve Mile Lake, which was said to be twelve miles from Estherville.

Geography
According to the United States Census Bureau, Twelve Mile Lake Township covers an area of 35.2 square miles (91.17 square kilometers); of this, 34.86 square miles (90.29 square kilometers, 99.03 percent) is land and 0.34 square miles (0.88 square kilometers, 0.97 percent) is water.

Cities, towns, villages
 Wallingford (west quarter)

Unincorporated towns
 Raleigh at 
(This list is based on USGS data and may include former settlements.)

Adjacent townships
 Estherville Township (north)
 Center Township (northeast)
 High Lake Township (east)
 Walnut Township, Palo Alto County (southeast)
 Lost Island Township, Palo Alto County (south)
 Lake Township, Clay County (southwest)
 Lloyd Township, Dickinson County (west)
 Richland Township, Dickinson County (northwest)

Major highways
  Iowa Highway 4

Lakes
 Twelvemile Lake

School districts
 Estherville Lincoln Central Community School District
 Graettinger-Terril Community School District

Political districts
 Iowa's 4th congressional district
 State House District 7
 State Senate District 4

References
 United States Census Bureau 2008 TIGER/Line Shapefiles
 United States Board on Geographic Names (GNIS)
 United States National Atlas

External links
 US-Counties.com
 City-Data.com

Townships in Emmet County, Iowa
Townships in Iowa